Alan Neil Jevons (b 1956) is a Church in Wales priest: he has been Archdeacon of Brecon since 2013.

He was born in Bournemouth and educated at the University of Exeter and Ridley Hall, Cambridge. He was ordained in 1982. After  curacies in Halesowen and Heywood he was Team Vicar of Hereford from 1987 to 1993. He was at Much Birch from 1993 until 2002; and Tenbury Wells from 2002 until 2007. He was Vicar of Llyn Syfaddan  from 2007 until 2015; and Social Responsibility Officer for the Diocese of Swansea and Brecon from 2007 until his appointment as Archdeacon.

References

1956 births
Clergy from Bournemouth
Living people
Archdeacons of Brecon
Alumni of the University of Exeter
Alumni of Ridley Hall, Cambridge
20th-century Welsh Anglican priests
21st-century Welsh Anglican priests